Tank AA, 20 mm Quad, Skink was a Canadian self-propelled anti-aircraft gun, developed in 1943–44, in response to a requirement from the First Canadian Army. Due to a lack of threat from the German , the Skink was cancelled in 1944 after only 3 were built from Grizzly I cruisers.

Development
The development of a fully enclosed quadruple 20 mm mounting on the chassis of the Grizzly tank (M4A1 Sherman tanks built in Canada from August 1943) was approved by the Canadian Army Technical Development Board as Project 47 in March, 1943. In keeping with the tradition of giving Canadian armoured fighting vehicles animal names, the proposed tank was named after the skink, Ontario's only lizard.

The Canadian Ministry of Munitions and Supply had the turret designed in-house by its Army Engineering Design Branch (AEDB) with help from the Inspection Board. The Waterloo Manufacturing Co. in Waterloo, Ontario, was given the task of building a preliminary wooden mock-up. This was completed on 18 September 1943. The construction of two welded armour pilot turrets was then authorized. The first pilot turret was demonstrated in mid-December. In January 1944 a pilot turret was successfully tested on a Grizzly chassis. Due to the challenges of welding a turret of such a complex shape from Rolled homogeneous armour plate, Dominion Foundries of Hamilton was contracted to produce a fully enclosed cast turret (One of the largest armour castings ever made in Canada).

Originally it was planned to arm the Skink with four 20 mm Hispano-Suiza cannons as used on aircraft and the first prototypes were so armed. In January 1944, the 21st Army Group in Europe decided that only British 20 mm Polsten guns would be used (the Polsten was a simplified version of the Oerlikon cannon) by its units. This required a redesign of the turret, which was completed in April. This change delayed the project by 3 to 4 months, while 21st Army Group's reduction in the number of AA guns to be issued to its units led to a reduction in the number of Skink turrets which were required. This dwindled to zero in late July 1944, when 21 Army Group decided that as the German air force - the Luftwaffe - had been virtually eliminated over North West Europe, there was no longer a requirement for self-propelled anti-aircraft guns. The Skink contract was cancelled in mid-August and only three complete vehicles and eight turret kits were completed.

Design
The Skink’s four 20 mm guns could fire 650 rounds per minute per gun. A modified Oilgear hydraulic traverse with two pumps could rotate the turret at up to 65° per second and - crucially for a quick response- - accelerate from rest to 60° in two seconds. The guns’ elevation was also hydraulically assisted so the guns could move at up to 45° per second in an arc from -5° to +80°. The gunner controlled both elevation and rotation with a joystick, and used a Mk.IX reflector sight. Initially it was  planned to build 300 Skink turrets for the Canadian and British armies. One Skink was sent to Britain for evaluation and was then sent to France for field trials with the First Canadian Army.

Combat Use
From 6 February to 11 March 1945, the Skink visited all but one of the Canadian armoured regiments - from Nijmegen to the Cleve area - frequently engaging the German army. All units found it to be a valuable asset but no enemy aircraft presented itself to the Skink's guns and its main function was to flush out stubborn pockets of enemy infantry and force their surrender. The remaining Skink pilots and the completed turrets went into long-term storage in Canada where, at some point, they were scrapped. Only some unfinished turret castings salvaged from the firing range survive.

See also
 Crusader III Anti-Aircraft Tank
 T77 Multiple Gun Motor Carriage
 Wirbelwind

Notes

References
 Canada's Anti-Aircraft Sherman archived from geocities.com through waybackmachine
 Chamberlain, Peter, and Ellis, Chris. British and American Tanks of World War Two. London: Cassell & Co., 2001 (reprint 2000 edition).
 Fitzsimons, Bernard, General Editor. The Encyclopedia of 20th Century Weapons and Warfare, Volume 21, p. 2337-8, "Skink". London: Phoebus, 1978.
 Hogg, Ian V. The Greenhill Armoured Fighting Vehicles Data Book, p. 95, "Skink AA Tank". London: Greenhill Books, 2000.
 Hogg, Ian V., and Weeks, John. The Illustrated Encyclopedia of Military Vehicles, p. 68, "Ram Cruiser Tank". Toronto: Hamlyn, 1980.
 http://mailer.fsu.edu/~akirk/tanks/can/Canada.htm 
 Law, Clive - Making Tracks - Tank Production in Canada, Service Publications, Ottawa, Canada 2001
 Lucy, Roger V. (2005). The Skink in Canadian Service". Ottawa, ON: Service Publications.

Skink
World War II self-propelled anti-aircraft weapons
Tracked self-propelled artillery